Sahajanand Saraswati ( (22 February 1889 – 26 June 1950) was an ascetic, a nationalist and a peasant leader of India. Although born in United Provinces (present-day Uttar Pradesh), his social and political activities focussed mostly on Bihar in the initial days, and gradually spread to the rest of India with the formation of the All India Kisan Sabha. He had set up an ashram at Bihta, near Patna ,Bihar carried out most of his work in the later part of his life from there. He was an intellectual, prolific writer, social reformer and revolutionary.

Biography
Swami Sahajanand Saraswati was born in Deva Village near Dullahpur, Ghazipur district in eastern Uttar Pradesh Provinces in 1889 to a family of Bhumihars, also known as Babhans. He was the last of six sons and was then called Naurang Rai. His mother died when he was a child and he was raised by an aunt.

The Kisan Sabha movement started in Bihar under the leadership of Saraswati who had formed in 1929 the Bihar Provincial Kisan Sabha (BPKS) in order to mobilise peasant grievances against the zamindari attacks on their occupancy rights, and thus sparking the farmers' movements in India.

Gradually the peasant movement intensified and spread across the rest of India. All these radical developments on the peasant front culminated in the formation of the All India Kisan Sabha (AIKS) at the Lucknow session of the Indian National Congress in April 1936 with Saraswati elected as its first President and it involved prominent leaders such as N. G. Ranga and E. M. S. Namboodiripad. The Kisan Manifesto, which was released in August 1936, demanded abolition of the zamindari system and cancellation of rural debts. In October 1937, the AIKS adopted the red flag as its banner. Soon, its leaders became increasingly distant with Congress, and repeatedly came in confrontation with Congress governments in Bihar and United Province.

Saraswati organised the Bakasht Movement in Bihar in 1937–1938. "Bakasht" means self-cultivated. The movement was against the eviction of tenants from Bakasht lands by zamindars and led to the passing of the Bihar Tenancy Act and the Bakasht Land Tax. He also led the successful struggle in the Dalmia Sugar Mill at Bihta, where peasant-worker unity was the most important characteristic.

On hearing of Saraswati's arrest during the Quit India Movement, Subhash Chandra Bose and All India Forward Bloc decided to observe 28 April as All-India Swami Sahajanand Day in protest of his  incarceration by the British Raj.

Saraswati died on 26 June 1950.

Subhash Chandra Bose, leader of the Forward Bloc, said:

Publication

Saraswati's publications include:

Books
  Bhumihar Brahmin Parichay (Introduction to Bhumihar Brahmins), in Hindi.
  Jhootha Bhay Mithya Abhiman (False Fear False Pride), in Hindi.
  Brahman Kaun?
  Brahman Samaj ki Sthiti (Situation of the Brahmin Society) in Hindi.
  Brahmarshi Vansha Vistar in Sanskrit, Hindi and English.
  Karmakalap, in Sanskrit and Hindi.

Autobiographical works
  Mera Jeewan Sangharsha (My LIfe Struggle), in Hindi.
  Kisan Sabha ke Sansmaran (Recollections of the Kisan Sabha), in Hindi.
  Maharudra ka Mahatandav, in Hindi.
  Jang aur Rashtriya Azadi
  Ab Kya ho?
  Gaya jile mein sava maas
  Samyukta Kisan Sabha, Samyukta Samajvadi Sabha ke Dastavez.
  Kisanon ke Dave
  Dhakaich ka bhashan

Ideological works
  Kranti aur Samyukta Morcha
  Gita Hridaya (Heart of the Gita)
  Kisanon ke Dave
  Maharudra ka Mahatandav
  Kalyan mein chapein lekh

Works related to peasantry and Zamindars
  Kisan kaise ladten hain?
  Kisan kya karen?
  Zamindaron ka khatma kaise ho?
  Kisan ke dost aur dushman
  Bihar prantiya kisansabha ka ghoshna patra
  Kisanon ki phasane ki taiyariyan
  On the other side
  Rent reduction in Bihar, How it Works?
  Zamindari kyon utha di jaye?
 Khet Mazdoor (Agricultural Labourer), in Hindi, written in Hazaribagh Central Jail.
 Jharkhand ke kisan
 Bhumi vyavastha kaisi ho?
 Kisan andolan kyun aur kya?
 Gaya ke Kisanon ki Karun Kahani
 Ab kya ho?
 Congress tab aur ab
 Congress ne kisanon ke liye kya kiya?
 Maharudra ka Mahatandav
 Swamiji ki Diary
 Kisan sabha ke dastavez
 Swamiji ke patrachar
 Lok sangraha mein chapen lekh
 Hunkar mein chapein lekh
 Vishal Bharat mein chapein lekh
 Bagi mein chapein lekh
 Bhumihar Brahmin mein chapein lekh
 Swamiji ki Bhashan Mala
 Krishak mein chapein lekh
 Yogi mein chapein lekh
 Kisan sevak
 Anya lekh
 Address of the chairman, Reception Committee, The All India Anti-Compromise Conference, First Session, Kisan Nagar, Ramgarh, Hazaribagh, 19 & 20 March 1940, Ramgarh, 1940.
 Presidential Address, 8th Annual Session of the Kisan Sabha, Bezwada, 1944.

Translations into English
Swami Sahajanand and the Peasants of Jharkhand: A View from 1941 translated and edited by Walter Hauser along with the unedited Hindi original (Manohar Publishers, paperback, 2005).
Sahajanand on Agricultural Labour and the Rural Poor translated and edited by Walter Hauser Manohar Publishers, paperback, 2005.
Religion, Politics, and the Peasants: A Memoir of India's Freedom Movement translated and edited by Walter Hauser Manohar Publishers, hardbound, 2003.
Walter Hauser, along with K.C. Jha, (editor and translator of Swami Sahajanand’s autobiography Mera Jivan Sangharsh – My Life Struggle) Culture, Vernacular Politics and the Peasants: India, 1889-1950, Delhi, Manohar, 2015.
Ramchandra Pradhan (editor and translator), The Struggle of My Life: Autobiography of Swami Sahajanand Saraswati, Delhi, Oxford University Press, 2018.

Biographies
 Nilanshu Ranjan, Swami Sahajanand Saraswati, National Book Trust, New Delhi, .
 Raghav Sharan Sharma, Swami Sahajanand Saraswati, Publications Division, Government of India, 2008.

Official recognition
The Government of India issued a commemorative stamp in commemoration of Saraswati on 26 June 2000 by Ram Vilas Paswan, the then Minister of Communications.

The Indian Council of Agricultural Research gives the Swamy Sahajanand Saraswati Extension Scientist/ Worker Award.

In 2001, a two-day Kisan Mahapanchayat was organised on the occasion of the 112th birth anniversary of Saraswati.

Bihar Governor R. S. Gavai released a book on the life of Saraswati on his 57th death anniversary in Patna.

Swami Sahajanand Postgraduate College is established in his home district Ghazipur (U.P.) in the pious memory of Swami Sahajanand.

See also
 Agrarian struggle in Bihar
 Debt bondage in India
 All India United Kisan Sabha

References

Further reading
 
Sahajanand on Agricultural Labour and the Rural Poor, edited by Walter Hauser, Manohar Publishers, paperback, 2005, 
Swami And Friends: Sahajanand Saraswati And Those Who Refuse To Let The Past of Bihar's Peasant Movements Become History By Arvind Narayan Das, Paper for the Peasant Symposium, May 1997 University of Virginia, Charlottesville, Virginia
Bagchi, A.K., 1976, 'Deindustrialisation in Gangetic Bihar, 1809– 1901' in Essays in Honour of Prof. S.C. Sarkar, New Delhi.
Banaji, Jairus, 1976, "The Peasantry in the Feudal MOde of Production: Towards an Economic Model", Journal of Peasant Studies, April.
Bandopadhyay, D., 1973, `Agrarian Relations in Two Bihar Districts', Mainstream, 2 June, New Delhi.
Banerjee, N., 1978, `All the Backwards', Sunday, 9 April, Calcutta. Bihar, 1938, Board of Revenue, Average Prices of Staple Food Crops from 1888, Patna.
Judith M. Brown, 1972, Gandhi's Rise to Power: Indian Politics, 1915–1922, London.
Datta, K.K., 1957, History of the Freedom Movement in Bihar, Patna.
Devanand, Swami, 1958, Virat Kisan Samaroh (Massive Peasant Convention), in Hindi, Bihar Kisan Sangh, Bihta.
R, R.Diwakar, ed., 1957, Bihar Through the Ages, Patna.
Mohandas Karamchand Gandhi, 1921, 'The Zamindar and the Ryots', Young India, Vol. III (New Series) No. 153, 18 May.
Mohandas Karamchand Gandhi, 1940, An Autobiography or The Story of My experiments in Truth, Ahmedabad.
Maharaj, R.N., 1976, 'Freed Bonded Labour Camp at Palamau', National Labour Institute Bulletin, October, New Delhi.
Mishra, G., 1968. 'The Socio-economic Background of Gandhi's Champaran Movement', Indian Economic and Social History Review, 5(3), New Delhi.
Mishra, G., 1978, Agrarian Problems of Permanent Settlement: A Case Study of Champaran, New Delhi.
Mitra, Manoshi, 1983, Agrarian Social Structure in Bihar: Continuity and Change, 1786–1820, Delhi : Manohar.
Mitra, N., ed, 1938, Indian Annual Register, July–December 1937, Vol. II, Calcutta.
Jawaharlal Nehru, 1936, An Autobiography, London.
Pouchepadass, J., 1974, 'Local Leaders and the Intelligentsia in the Champaran Satyagraha', Contributions to Indian Sociology, New Series, No.8, November, New Delhi.
Prasad, P.H., 1979, 'Semi-Feudalism: Basic Constraint in Indian Agriculture' in Arvind N. Das & V. Nilakant, eds., Agrarian Relations in India, New Delhi.
Rajendra Prasad, 1949, Satyagraha in Champaran, Ahmedabad.
Rajendra Prasad, 1957, Autobiography, Bombay.
N. G. Ranga, 1949, Revolutionary Peasants, New Delhi.
N. G. Ranga, 1968, Fight For Freedom, New Delhi.
Shanin, Teodor, 1978, "Defining Peasants: Conceptualisations and Deconceptualisations: Old and New in a Marxist Debate", Manchester University.
Anugrah Narayan Sinha, 1961, Mere Sansmaran (My Recollections), in Hindi Patna.
Indradeep Sinha, 1969, Sathi ke Kisanon ka Aitihasic Sangharsha (Historic Struggle of Sathi Peasants), in Hindi, Patna.

External links

 https://www.iaaw.hu-berlin.de/de/region/suedasien/publikationen/sachronik/11-focus-kumar-pratyush-a-kisan-at-the-crossroads-of-history-politics-and-law-political-thought-and-action-of-swami-sahajanand-saraswati.pdf
 Swami Sahajanand Saraswati images
 http://www.bihartimes.in/articles/Manish_Thakur/swami_sahjanand.html
 https://prahri.com/culture/sahjanand-saraswati-a-nationalist-and-peasent-leader/7100/

1889 births
1950 deaths
Debt bondage in India
Indian independence activists from Uttar Pradesh
20th-century Indian educational theorists
20th-century Indian philosophers
20th-century Hindu philosophers and theologians
Indian autobiographers
Indian memoirists
Historians of India
People from Ghazipur
Writers from Patna
Political philosophers
Hindi-language writers
Indian Marxists
Marxist humanists
Indian Marxist writers
Sanskrit writers
20th-century Indian historians
20th-century Indian biographers
Farmers' rights activists
20th-century memoirists